Hubert Cockroft (21 November 1918 – 1979) was an English professional footballer who played as a left half.

Career
Born in Barnsley, Cockroft played for Barnsley, Bradford City, Halifax Town and Peterborough United.

He played for Bradford City between May 1946 and July 1947, making 27 appearances in the Football League and 3 appearances in the FA Cup for them.

Sources

References

1918 births
1979 deaths
English footballers
Barnsley F.C. players
Bradford City A.F.C. players
Halifax Town A.F.C. players
Peterborough United F.C. players
English Football League players
Association football wing halves